Varun Sharma (born 4 February 1990) is an Indian actor and comedian. He is known for his comic as well as supporting roles in various Hindi films.

Education
He began his studies at The Lawrence School in Sanawar, later transferring to Apeejay School in Jalandhar to complete Class 11 and 12. He obtained a bachelor's degree in Media, Entertainment and Film Technology from ITFT Chandigarh.

Career
In 2013, Sharma appeared in his first Bollywood film, the comedy-drama Fukrey, directed by Mrighdeep Singh Lamba. It emerged as a commercial success with earnings of  worldwide.

In 2015, Sharma first appeared in Abhishek Dogra's comedy Dolly Ki Doli and successful romantic comedy Kis Kisko Pyaar Karoon, co-starring Kapil Sharma, came next. His final film of the year was Rohit Shetty's action romance Dilwale alongside Shah Rukh Khan, Varun Dhawan, Kajol, and Kriti Sanon, which broke several box office records and proved to be his highest-grossing release. The feature grossed over  worldwide to emerge as one of Indian cinema's highest grossers.

Varun starred alongside Kriti Sanon and Late Sushant Singh Rajput in Dinesh Vijan's reincarnation romance Raabta (2017). It received a negative response from critics and flopped at the box office.

In 2018, he appeared briefly alongside Govinda in the comedy FryDay. In 2019, Sharma starred in Arjun Patiala alongside Sanon and Diljit Dosanjh, Khandaani Shafakhana alongside Sonakshi Sinha and Badshah, and Chhichhore alongside Sushant Singh Rajput and Shraddha Kapoor.

In 2020, Varun has also been seen as the host for Flipkart Video's (OTT video streaming platform owned by Flipkart) comedy show, Sab Se Funny Kaun.

His next film after that one was Roohi Afzana, directed by Hardik Mehta and produced by Dinesh Vijan under the banner Maddock Films, which co-stars Rajkummar Rao and Janhvi Kapoor. It released in 2021. After the release of Roohi, news are floating about Varun Sharma's manager late Disha Salian's name has been credited at the end credits as Disha had managed Varun throughout the shooting of Roohi.

Filmography

Awards and nominations

References

External links
 

Indian male film actors
Living people
Male actors in Hindi cinema
Male actors from Punjab, India
People from Jalandhar
Punjabi people
1990 births
21st-century Indian male actors
Lawrence School, Sanawar alumni
Apeejay School alumni
Zee Cine Awards winners